Ladenburg is a surname. Notable people with the surname include:

Albert Ladenburg (1842-1911), German chemist
Connie Ladenburg, American politician
Eugenie Mary Ladenburg Davie (1895–1975), American political activist
John Ladenburg (born 1949), American politician
Rudolf Ladenburg (1882–1952), German atomic physicist